Margaret Ladd (born November 8, 1942) is an American actress, best known for her role as Emma Channing in the CBS primetime soap opera, Falcon Crest (1981–90).

Life and career
Ladd was born in Providence, Rhode Island. She began acting on the 1960s soap opera A Flame in the Wind as Jane Skerba from 1964 to 1965. She later starred in films include The Friends of Eddie Coyle (1973) and A Wedding (1978), and appeared on number of television shows. like Taxi and Quincy, M.E.. Ladd also co-starred in a number of made-for-television movies, and had supporting roles in films I'm Dancing as Fast as I Can, The Escape Artist, and The Whales of August. She also appeared in Broadway shows, like My Sweet Charlie and Sheep on the Runway.

Ladd is best known for playing Emma Channing in the 1980s CBS primetime soap opera, Falcon Crest throughout its nine-year run from 1981 to 1990. She had a small part in the film What's up, Scarlet? (2005); her first appearance after a hiatus of 14 years. In 2014, she appeared in two episodes of Amazon comedy-drama, Mozart in the Jungle. In 2016, Ladd was cast in the Woody Allen miniseries Crisis in Six Scenes for Amazon Studios.

Ladd is married to playwright Lyle Kessler. They have twins Katherine and Michael.

Filmography

Film

Television

References

External links
 

1942 births
Living people
American television actresses
American soap opera actresses
Actresses from Rhode Island
20th-century American actresses
21st-century American actresses
Actors from Providence, Rhode Island